Cato Blue is an informal term describing a New Zealand railway locomotive livery (resulting from the combination of blue, grey and yellow in the colour scheme) found in common usage amongst the railfan community. The livery was first worn on DFT 7160 as a variation of the New Zealand Rail blue livery. With the introduced of Tranz Rail on 18 October 1995, the livery was adopted to replace New Zealand Rails blue livery, which was introduced in 1991. The scheme was known as Cato Blue after its creator, Cato Partners. DFT 7199 was the first locomotive repainted in the livery after Tranz Rail took over the rail system.

It wasn't just locomotives that were repainted in the livery. All of the 44 Ganz-Mavag built EM/ET electric multiple units, along with one of the English Electric built DM/D EMU units were also repainted in the Cato Blue livery, with the Tranz Metro logo on the side of each car. Tranz Scenics 56-foot, 60-foot and 64-foot carriages and AG vans were also repainted in the livery, with the Tranz Scenic logo on each of side of the carriages. Several 56-foot carriages, that were used on the Wairarapa Connection until 2007, had the Tranz Metro logo on them.

It was then replaced in May 2001 when Tranz Rail introduced the Bumble-Bee livery to promote level crossing safety.

AG 153 can be seen being used on the Capital Connection when AG 130 is out of service. Although the two ADs, and five AGs are in storage in Otahuhu and Waltham, they are still operational and can be seen being used on special occasions.

Variations
Since the introduction of the livery in October 1995, there have been a couple of variations on several locomotives:

Several locomotives that were repainted in the New Zealand Rail livery, had the Tranz Rail logo painted over the New Zealand Rail logo, along with a blue oblong patch. Some locos received the livery with blue cab stripes.
A small group of locos had truncated stripes long enough to cover over the non-reflective numbers
DFT 7145 had blue cab stripes, but without the numbers applied for a short period of time.
DXs 5431 and 5517 had been repainted into the livery, but yellow cabs instead of grey. Both locos were repainted in the original version before being repainted in this variation, and later they had black chutes fitted on the right side of the long-hood.
TR 943 was repainted in the livery with blue all over the sides of the long and short hoods and cab, grey on top of the hoods and cab, yellow head-stocks and the Tranz Rail logo painted on the cab. The loco was original repainted in this livery by Hillside Workshops with "Transtec Engineering Dunedin" painted on the sides of the long-hood, but this was later removed.
Although not an official variation, DCP 4755 received KiwiRail stickers on the front of the short-hood, and back of the long-hood.

With the rights to Cato Blue sold to Tranz Scenic in 2001, DCP 4761 received a repaint in the livery, but with the Tranz Scenic logo in place of the Tranz Rail logo. DCPs 4559 and 4628 had the Tranz Scenic logo painted on over the Tranz Rail logo. DSC 2624 was repainted by Tranz Scenic with the cab being repainted yellow, instead of grey.

References 

Rail liveries of New Zealand